Robert Bodley (31 July 1878 – 6 November 1956) was a South African sport shooter who competed in the 1912 Summer Olympics and in the 1920 Summer Olympics.

1912 Stockholm

In the 1912 Summer Olympics he participated in the following events:

 Team military rifle – fourth place
 Team free rifle – sixth place
 300 metre military rifle, three positions – 45th place
 600 metre free rifle – 54th place
 300 metre free rifle, three positions – 55th place

1920 Antwerp

Eight years later he won the silver medal with the South African team in the team 600 metre military rifle, prone competition.

In the 1920 Summer Olympics he also participated in the following events:

 Team 300 and 600 metre military rifle, prone – fifth place
 Team 50 metre small-bore rifle – eighth place
 Team 300 metre military rifle, prone – eighth place
 Team 300 metre military rifle, standing – ninth place
 Team free rifle – tenth place
 300 metre free rifle, three positions – result unknown
 50 metre small-bore rifle – result unknown

References

External links
profile

1878 births
1956 deaths
Sportspeople from Cape Town
South African male sport shooters
ISSF rifle shooters
Olympic shooters of South Africa
Shooters at the 1912 Summer Olympics
Shooters at the 1920 Summer Olympics
Olympic silver medalists for South Africa
Olympic medalists in shooting
Medalists at the 1920 Summer Olympics
Cape Colony people